Austin Faoliu (born January 9, 1999) is an American football defensive tackle for the Seattle Sea Dragons of the XFL. He played college football at the University of Oregon.

Early years
Faoliu attended Junípero Serra Catholic High School. As a sophomore, he had 48 carries for 351 yards and 4 touchdowns.

As a senior, he transferred to Mater Dei High School and was named a starter at nose guard. He tallied 32 tackles (9 for loss), 1.5 sacks and one forced fumble, while receiving All-County honors. He contributed to a second place in the CIF Southern Section Division 1.

College career
Faoliu accepted a football scholarship from the University of Oregon. As a freshman, he appeared in 12 games, starting the first two contests. He posted 22 tackles (2.5 for loss) and one sack. He had 3 tackles, one sack and one forced fumble against the University of Arizona. He made 4 tackles against Boise State University.

As a sophomore, he appeared in 11 games with 6 starts. He totaled 44 tackles and 2 sacks. He had 7 tackles against Portland State University. He made 7 tackles against the University of Utah.

As a junior, he appeared in 13 games with 8 starts. He registered 39 tackles (5 for loss), 2 sacks. He had 6 tackles and 1.5 sacks against Arizona State University. He made 8 tackles (1.5 for loss) and one quarterback hurry against Oregon State University.

As a senior, the football season was reduced to 7 games due to the COVID-19 pandemic. He started in 6 contests, while collecting 21 tackles (0.5 for loss). He had five tackles against Oregon State University. He finished his college career with 43 games, 124 tackles, 10 tackles for loss, 5 sacks and 3 forced fumbles.

Professional career

Dallas Cowboys
Faoliu was signed as an undrafted free agent by the Dallas Cowboys after the 2021 NFL Draft on May 14. On August 31, he was waived. On September 1, he was signed to the practice squad. On September 27, he was promoted to the active roster. He appeared in one game and had 2 tackles.

He signed a reserve/future contract with the Cowboys on January 19, 2022. He was waived on August 15, 2022.

Seattle Sea Dragons
Faoliu was selected by the XFL Seattle Sea Dragons in the Group 3 fourth round (31st overall) of the 2023 XFL Draft.

References

External links
 Oregon Ducks bio

Living people
1999 births
Sportspeople from Santa Ana, California
Players of American football from California
American football defensive tackles
Oregon Ducks football players
Dallas Cowboys players
Seattle Sea Dragons players